The Verbandsliga Württemberg is a German amateur football division administered by the Württemberg Football Association, one of the 21 German state football associations. Being the top flight of the Württemberg state association, the Verbandsliga is currently a level 6 division of the German football league system.

History
The Verbandsliga Württemberg was introduced along with the superordinate Oberliga Baden-Württemberg in 1978 as a merger between the Amateurliga Nordwürttemberg and the Amateurliga Schwarzwald-Bodensee. The top five teams of both divisions were promoted to the new Oberliga while the teams ranked six to twelve remained at Verbandsliga level. Both 13th ranked teams had to play a decider for the last Verbandsliga spot. All other team were relegated to the Landesliga.

Since its introduction, the Verbandsliga always was at the top of the Württemberg football league system and was set at level 4 of the German football league system originally. After the introduction of both the Regionalliga Süd in 1994 and of the 3. Liga in 2008, as of today has been downgraded to level 6 of the system.

There are some clubs from western Bavaria playing in the Württemberg football league system. At last the SpVgg Au/Iller played in the Verbandsliga during the 2009-10 season. Au/Iller is a part of the town Illertissen. The FV Illertissen also played in the Verbandsliga and even gained promotion to Oberliga in 2008 before leaving the Württemberg system in 2012 by joining the Bavarian Football Association upon introduction of the Regionalliga Bayern.

Promotion and relegation
The Verbandsliga champions gain direct promotion to the Oberliga. The runners-up must play-off against the winner of the Verbandsliga Nordbaden versus Südbaden runners-up series for one additional promotion. In 1981 no extra spot and in 1994 three extra spots were available due to league format changes.

Feeder leagues to the Verbandsliga Württemberg
Landesliga Württemberg 1
Landesliga Württemberg 2
Landesliga Württemberg 3
Landesliga Württemberg 4

Usually, the teams ranked last four in the Verbandsliga are relegated to Landesliga directly. The winners of each of the four Landesliga divisions win direct promotion to the Verbandsliga. The fifth-last team of the Verbandsliga have to play-off against the best Landesliga runner-up for one spot in the Verbandsliga. The number of direct relegations can vary depending on the number of Württembergian teams relegating from the Oberliga Baden-Württemberg to the Verbandsliga.

League champions & runners-up
The league champions and runners-up of the league.

Promoted teams in bold.
With five titles SV Bonlanden is the record league champion.
With SpVgg Au/Iller the title went to Bavaria in 1999.
In 2008 third-placed FV Illertissen was also promoted.

League placings

The complete list of clubs in the league and their league placings since 1994.

Key

 S = No of seasons in league (as of 2022–23)

Notes
 1 In 1995, GSV Maichingen withdrew their team from the Oberliga.
 2 In 2001, SSV Ulm 1846 withdrew from the 2nd Bundesliga to the Verbandsliga for financial reasons.
 3 In 2007, the football department of SB Heidenheim left the club to form 1. FC Heidenheim 1846. 
 4 In 2011, VfL Kirchheim/Teck voluntarily withdrew from the league.
 5 In 2003, VfR Heilbronn merged with SpVgg Heilbronn to form FC Heilbronn.
 6 In 2010, TSV Crailsheim withdrew their team from the Oberliga.
 7 In 2008, TSV Schwieberdingen withdrew their team from the Oberliga.
 8 In 2014, 1. FC Heidenheim withdrew their reserve team from the Oberliga.
 9 In 2017, Stuttgarter Kickers withdrew their reserve team from the Oberliga.

References

Sources
 Deutschlands Fußball in Zahlen,  An annual publication with tables and results from the Bundesliga to Verbandsliga/Landesliga. DSFS.
 Kicker Almanach,  The yearbook on German football from Bundesliga to Oberliga, since 1937. Kicker Sports Magazine.
 Süddeutschlands Fußballgeschichte in Tabellenform 1897-1988  History of Southern German football in tables, by Ludolf Hyll.
 Die Deutsche Liga-Chronik 1945-2005  History of German football from 1945 to 2005 in tables. DSFS. 2006.

External links 
 Das deutsche Fußball-Archiv  Historic German league tables
 WFV: Verbandsliga and Landesliga 

Wurt
Football competitions in Baden-Württemberg
1978 establishments in Germany
Sports leagues established in 1978